Ohoka is a small semi-rural township on the northern outskirts of Christchurch in New Zealand.

The New Zealand Ministry for Culture and Heritage gives a translation of "place of the stake for a decoy parrot" for Ōhoka.

A new subdivision proposed in 2022 would add 800–850 houses, shops and a village square to Ohoka. Some residents are campaigning against the subdivision.

Demographics
Ohoka straddles two SA1 statistical areas which cover  Ohoka is part of the wider Mandeville-Ohoka statistical area.

The SA1 statistical areas had a population of 297 at the 2018 New Zealand census, a decrease of 9 people (−2.9%) since the 2013 census, and unchanged since the 2006 census. There were 105 households, comprising 153 males and 141 females, giving a sex ratio of 1.09 males per female, with 54 people (18.2%) aged under 15 years, 39 (13.1%) aged 15 to 29, 129 (43.4%) aged 30 to 64, and 72 (24.2%) aged 65 or older.

Ethnicities were 98.0% European/Pākehā, 3.0% Māori, and 1.0% Asian. People may identify with more than one ethnicity.

Although some people chose not to answer the census's question about religious affiliation, 38.4% had no religion, 46.5% were Christian and 1.0% had other religions.

Of those at least 15 years old, 63 (25.9%) people had a bachelor's or higher degree, and 30 (12.3%) people had no formal qualifications. 63 people (25.9%) earned over $70,000 compared to 17.2% nationally. The employment status of those at least 15 was that 117 (48.1%) people were employed full-time, 48 (19.8%) were part-time, and 3 (1.2%) were unemployed.

Education
Ohoka School is Ohoka's only school. It is a state co-educational full primary school with a decile rating of 10 and a roll of  students (as of

References

External links
 Visitor Information Centre website

Waimakariri District
Populated places in Canterbury, New Zealand